Comporium, Inc. is a local telephone, internet, cable and home security provider that centrally operates in York and Lancaster counties in the north-central section of South Carolina.  The Corporate headquarters of Comporium is located at the intersection of Black Street and Elizabeth Lane in the city of Rock Hill, South Carolina, United States.  There are also local cable channels owned and operated by Comporium such as, Cable News 2 (CN2), CN2 eXtra, and The Weather Channel's local Weatherscan for Rock Hill.

Locations
Comporium Communications offers services in parts or all of the following counties:

South Carolina 
Aiken
Calhoun
Chester
Edgefield
Lancaster
Lexington
Orangeburg
Saluda
York

North Carolina 
Mecklenburg — Serving the Ayrsley area in Steele Creek and areas of Pineville.
Transylvania

History
In 1894, John Anderson, John Cherry and Andrew Smith founded the Rock Hill Telephone Company.  E. L. and Mary Barnes bought the company in 1912; their great-grandchildren still run the company today.  
In 2001, Rock Hill Telephone Company and its affiliates became known as "Comporium," a word created from "Communications" and "Emporium"— a one-stop shop for a variety of products and services.

References

Cable television companies of the United States
Internet service providers of the United States
Rock Hill, South Carolina